The Turuk Pasi are a Muslim community found in the state of Bihar in India.

History and origin

The Turuk Pasi are followers of Islam. They are Sunni Muslims and found in the districts of Patna, Hajipur, Saran and Muzaffarpur. The Turuk Pasi speak Bhojpuri and Urdu.  Little is known about the circumstances of their conversion to Islam.

Present circumstances

The traditional occupation of the Turuk Pasi remains toddy-tapping.  They are issued licences by the government to collect toddy. Some work on daily wages as labourers. Rearing of cattle and poultry are important subsidiary occupations.

References

Dalit Muslim
Muslim communities of Bihar